Oculofaciocardiodental syndrome is a rare X-linked dominant genetic disorder.

Presentation

The incidence of this condition is less than 1 per million. It is primarily only found in females. Its highly rare in males, but some males were born with it. Teeth with large roots (radiculomegaly), heart defects and small eyes (microphthalmia) are the characteristic triad found in this syndrome.

Typical features of the condition include:
 Face
 Deep set eyes
 Broad nasal tip divided by a cleft
 Eyes
 Microphthalmia (small eyes)
 Early cataracts
 Glaucoma
 Teeth
 Radiculomegaly (teeth with very large roots)
 Delayed loss of primary teeth
 Missing (oligodontia) or abnormally small teeth
 Misaligned teeth
 Defective tooth enamel
 Heart defects
 Atrial and/or ventricular defects
 Mitral valve prolapse
 Mild intellectual disability and conductive or sensorineural hearing loss may occur.

Genetics

This condition is caused by lesions in the BCOR gene located on the short arm of the X chromosome (Xp11.4). This protein encodes the BCL6 corepressor, but little is currently known about its function. The inheritance is X-linked dominant.

A genetically related disorder is Lenz microphthalmia syndrome.

Diagnosis

Diagnosis can be confirmed through DNA testing.

Treatment

History

The first features of this syndrome noted were the abnormal teeth, which were described by Hayward in 1980.

References

X-linked dominant disorders
Syndromes